IHD can mean:

Ischemic heart disease
Intermittent hemodialysis
iHD Interactive Format
Human Rights Association (Turkey), Turkish, İnsan Hakları Derneği
Index of Hydrogen Deficiency
In-home device, a home energy monitor